The Denver Dynamite were an American Arena soccer team based in Denver, Colorado. They were founded in 2008 and they folded in 2015.

The team was a charter member of the Professional Arena Soccer League (PASL-Pro), the first division of arena (indoor) soccer in North America before going on hiatus for 2010-11 and returning to the Premier Arena Soccer League (PASL-Premier) for the Winter 2011-12 season (initially as the Rocky Mountain Rattlers before reverting to their original name). The team's colors were red, gold and blue.

Roster
As of January 21, 2012

Notable former players
  Chris Handsor  (2008-2010)
  Garth Archibald ŧ (2008-2009)
  Justin Dzuba ŧ (2008-2010)
  Ryan Creager ŧ (2008-2009)
  Tony Thomas ŧ (2008-2009)
ŧ – US National Arena Soccer Team Member

Year-by-year

United States Open Cup for Arena Soccer

Copa America

Playoff record

± Final Regular Season Game doubled as Divisional Playoff.

Honors
Championships
 None
Division Titles
 None

Coaching staff

Head coaches
  Mike Thompson (2008)
  John Wells (2009)
  Chris Handsor (2008-2009, 2010)
  Chuck Estrada (2009, 2010–2013) 
  Jay Hamilton (2012–2014)
  Tony Avery (2011-2012, 2014–Present)

Assistant coaches
  Chuck Estrada (2008, 2009-2010)
  Jeremy Gibe (2009)
  Mark Perdew (2009-2010)
  Tony Thomas (2012–2014)

Technical director / Goalkeeper coach
  Chuck Estrada (2009–2014)

Arenas
 Denver Sports Center (2008)
 Denver Bladium (2009)
 Westridge Recreation Center (2010-2011)
 Apex Field House (2012–2014)
 Parker Fieldhouse (2009, 2014–2015)

References

External links
Denver Dynamite official website

Premier Arena Soccer League website
Professional Arena Soccer League website

Soccer clubs in Denver
Soccer clubs in Colorado
Premier Arena Soccer League teams
Defunct Professional Arena Soccer League teams
Indoor soccer clubs in the United States
2008 establishments in Colorado
Association football clubs established in 2008